Papalotla is a municipality in the State of Mexico in Mexico.

In 2005, the municipality had a total population of 3766.

References

Municipalities of the State of Mexico
Populated places in the State of Mexico